BMIR 94.5 FM (Burning Man Information Radio) is the unlicensed community radio station for Burning Man, an event held annually in Black Rock Desert, Nevada. BMIR begins broadcasting on 94.5 FM on the playa in the week leading up to Burning Man. Currently, the station hosts more than 40 DJs that produce the programming played over the course of the event.

History
BMIR was founded by Carmen Mauk in 2000. Although the station violates federal regulations related to pirate radio and licensing radio stations, BMIR is mentioned in the Bureau of Land Management's Special Use Permit of federal lands as an event emergency broadcast alert system, the BLM however has no authority to permit its operation. Other licensed radio stations do exist that are within broadcast range of Burning Man but BMIR does not interfere with commercial broadcasting. BMIR remains operational without successful enforcement by the Federal Communications Commission (FCC) to shut the station down. In 2018 longtime Station Manager "Bobzilla" stepped down from a management role in BMIR due to his relocation from California to Europe and to concentrate on Shouting Fire, an international collective of Burning Man radio broadcasters from around the world as BMIR ceased year round internet broadcasting in 2017 due to organizational and event concerns over music licensing.  Shouting Fire broadcasts year-round on the internet and over FM from around the world at different frequencies.  Shouting Fire has become a focal point for "burner broadcasters" from other Burning Man events, coordinating simulcasts and exchanging programming as well as presenting regular weekly and biweekly live programs from hosts around the world.  Shouting Fire has become especially active in Europe as of 2019.

Prior to 2010, BMIR only broadcast live during the day, with automated nighttime programming. Starting in 2010, BMIR began broadcasting 24 hours a day, year round with live radio personalities and interviews but now only broadcasts during the event.

Current status
BMIR usually broadcasts from the event from the Wednesday before to the Tuesday after, with a full-time staff present during that time. BMIR is utilized during the event to broadcast important information regarding traffic, weather, and other BLM/LEO notices. The station has played a prominent part in dealing with issues happening in the "default world" including Hurricane Katrina and earthquakes in the Bay Area.

The station's primary operating crew is composed of a wide variety of skillsets, including an RF/FM engineer, a sound engineer, an IT engineer, and a full-time volunteer coordinator. The station accepts new volunteers every year, with on-air slots becoming available in the second year of service to the station. Many current and former station personnel are professional broadcasters.

References

External links
 
 
 
 Federal Communications Commission (FCC)
 Bureau of Land Management (BLM)
 Shouting Fire

Radio stations established in 2000
2000 establishments in Nevada
Burning Man
Community radio stations in the United States
Internet radio stations in the United States
Radio stations in Nevada
Pirate radio stations in the United States